Oxoides obscurus is a species of beetle in the family Carabidae, the only species in the genus Oxoides.

References

Lebiinae